Tunisian literature exists primarily in Arabic and in French. Arabic literature in Tunisia dates to the 7th century, with the arrival of Arab civilization in the region. Arabic literature is more important than francophone literature—which followed the introduction of the French protectorate in 1881—both in volume and value. The national bibliography lists 1,249 non-academic books published in 2002 in Tunisia, of which 885 titles are in Arabic. Nearly a third of these books are intended for children.

In 2003, the state budget dedicated 3 million Tunisian dinars to the support of literature. There are approximately 100 private Tunisian publishing houses that publish virtually all books.

Arabic literature

Arabic literary figures include Ali Douagi, who has written more than 150 radio plays, more than 500 poems and songs, and nearly 15 plays. Béchir Khraief gave new life to the Arabic novel in the 1930s and caused a scandal by including dialog in Tunisian dialect in his first short story. Other literary figures include Moncef Ghachem, Hassan Ben Othmen, Habib Selmi, Walid Soliman and Mahmoud Messadi. Messaadi was known for points of intersection of Islamic themes and nationalism within his work. Tunisian poetry is non-conformist and innovative: the language of Aboul-Qacem Echebbi opposes the lack of imagination in Arabic literature.

French-language literature

Francophone literature in Tunisia began, strictly speaking, in the 20th century. It was initially powered as much by Arab Muslim authors like Mahmoud Aslan and Salah Farhat as by minority authors of Jewish (e.g. Ryvel and César Benattar), Italian, or even Maltese (e.g. Marius Scalési) descent. Francophone literature has blossomed thanks to French people living in Tunisia who founded a Tunisian literary life modeled on that of Paris.

Today, Tunisian francophone literature is characterized by its critical approach. Contrary to the pessimism of Albert Memmi, who predicted that Tunisian literature was condemned to a young death, Tunisian writers like Abdelwahab Meddeb, Tahar Bekri, Mustapha Tlili, Hélé Béji, Aymen Hacen and Fawzi Mellah have broken through abroad. The themes of wandering, exile, disconnection, memory and representation are prominent in their writing .

See also 
Arabic literature
Francophone literature

References